Daniel Carey may refer to:

 Daniel R. Carey, member of the Massachusetts House of Representatives 
 Dan Carey (lacrosse) (born 1982), lacrosse player for the Toronto Rock
 Dan Carey (record producer) (born 1969), London-based producer, writer, mixer and remixer
 Dan Carey (curler) (born 1954), Canadian curler
 Danny Carey (born 1961), American drummer
 Daniel Carey (physician) (born 1960), cardiologist and health secretary to Virginia governor Ralph Northam